Athol Johnson (1915 - 1 January 1995) was an Australian international lawn bowler.

Bowls career
He competed in the first World Bowls Championship in Kyeemagh, New South Wales, Australia in 1966  and won a gold medal in the triples with Don Collins and John Dobbie and a silver medal in the fours. He also won a gold medal in the team event (Leonard Trophy).

References

1915 births
1995 deaths
Australian male bowls players
Bowls World Champions
20th-century Australian people